Goshen can refer to:
Goshen, Henderson County, Texas
Goshen, Parker County, Texas
Goshen, Walker County, Texas
Goshen Creek in Parker County, Texas